is a Japanese swimmer. She competed for Japan at the 2012 Summer Olympics, reaching the semifinals of the 100 m breaststroke.

References

Swimmers at the 2012 Summer Olympics
Olympic swimmers of Japan
1991 births
Living people
People from Tokyo
Japanese female breaststroke swimmers
Universiade medalists in swimming
Universiade gold medalists for Japan
Medalists at the 2015 Summer Universiade
21st-century Japanese women